Hotflush Recordings is a British record label. Founded by electronic musician Paul Rose, the label began as a UK Garage night on Stokes Croft in Bristol when Scuba was studying at University of Bristol, booking the likes of Artful Dodger (duo) in the early 2000s. Later becoming a label it has released music by Scuba, Mount Kimbie, Boxcutter, Vaccine, Joy Orbison, Untold and many more.

Album discography
HF001 Spectr - Red Hot / Motion (2003)
HF002 Dj Distance - Nomad (2004)
HF003 Search & Destroy - Candyfloss / Anger (2004)
HF004 Qualifide - Just Being Fooled (2004)
HF005 Slaughter Mob - L'Amour (2004)
HF006 Toasty - The Knowledge / Like Sun (2004)
HF007  Eric H - The Lights (2005)
HF008 Distance - 1 On 1 / Empire (2005)
HF009 Toasty - Take It Personal / Angel (2005)
HF010 Boxcutter - Brood / Sunshine (2006)
HF011 Elemental - Deep Under / Sparkle (2006)
HF012 Luke.Envoy - Gamma (2006)
HF013 Scuba - Twista / Plate (2006)
HF014 - Benga & Walsh / Walsh & Kromestar -Military / Panik Room (2006)
HF015i - Benga & Walsh / Marlow  / Gravious - Bingo / Road Kill / Temple Ball  (2007)
HF015ii - Vaccine & Intex System - Anaesthetic / Destroy (2007)
HF016 - Nabinghi - Belgium Chocolate / Cannibal Run (2007)
HFCD001 Various Artists - Space and Time (2007)
HFCD002 Scuba - A Mutual Antipathy (2008)
HFCD003 Scuba - Triangulation (2010)
HFCD004 Mount Kimbie - Crooks & Lovers (2010)
HFCD005 Various Artists - Back and Forth (2011)
HFCD006 Sepalcure - Sepalcure (2011)
HFCD007 Scuba - Personality (2012)
HFCD008 Jimmy Edgar - Majenta (2012)
HFCD009 Sigha - Living With Ghosts (2012)
HFT053 Blursome - Rendition Of You (2017)

References

External links

British record labels
Electronic music record labels
Dubstep record labels